The following highways are numbered 286:

Japan
 Japan National Route 286

United States
 Arizona State Route 286
 Connecticut Route 286
 Delaware Route 286
 Georgia State Route 286
 Iowa Highway 286 (former)
 Kentucky Route 286
 Maryland Route 286
 Massachusetts Route 286
 Minnesota State Highway 286
 Montana Secondary Highway 286
 New Hampshire Route 286
 New Mexico State Road 286
 New York State Route 286
 Ohio State Route 286
 Pennsylvania Route 286
 Tennessee State Route 286
 Texas State Highway 286
 Texas State Highway Loop 286
 Farm to Market Road 286 (former)
 Utah State Route 286
 Virginia State Route 286